Kamosiella is a genus of beetles in the family Buprestidae, containing the following species:

 Kamosiella dermestoides (Thomson, 1878)
 Kamosiella jactuosula (Peringuey, 1908)

References

Buprestidae genera